Spring Coulee is a hamlet in southern Alberta, Canada within Cardston County, located  east of Highway 5, approximately  southwest of Lethbridge.

History 
Spring Coulee once boasted a general store, a hotel, three grain elevators, a pool hall, a bank, a United Church, a community hall, a school and a few other businesses. Over time, as the farms around the hamlet became larger and people started moving away, Spring Coulee dwindled somewhat. The general store still stands but is in disrepair and has not been open for almost 15 years. The hotel, grain elevators, pool hall, bank and community hall have all been torn down. The United Church building was moved to near Glenwood and has been converted into a private home. The old four-room school still stands and has also been converted into a private home. 

The two main landmarks of the hamlet today are a seed cleaning plant and the Church of Jesus Christ of Latter-day Saints. 

There is still a sense of community among the hamlet's residents. Spring Coulee Day still happens on the church grounds every summer. There is the potential for Spring Coulee to accommodate new growth as its hamlet boundaries were recently extended.

Demographics 
The population of Spring Coulee according to the 2008 municipal census conducted by Cardston County is 43.

Notable people 
 Hugh B. Brown (1883-1975), cowboy, rancher, farmer, Canadian military officer, lawyer, oil company executive, politician, LDS Church leader

See also 
List of communities in Alberta
List of hamlets in Alberta

References 

Cardston County
Hamlets in Alberta